Nebria roddi is a species of ground beetle in the Nebriinae subfamily that is endemic to Altai.

References

roddi
Beetles described in 2001
Beetles of Asia
Endemic fauna of Altai